Thaddeus S. "Ted" Lechowicz (December 20, 1938 – January 5, 2009) was an American politician and businessman.

Born in Chicago, Illinois, Lechowicz went to Weber High School in Chicago. He received his associate degree from Wright Junior College and then in 1960 received his bachelor's degree in economics from North Park University. Lechowicz also did graduate work at DePaul University. Lechowicz served in the United States Army and was a first lieutenant. He worked in systems analysis and programming for the Cook County, Illinois Circuit Courts and was involved with the Democratic Party. Lechowicz served in the Illinois House of Representatives from 1969 to 1983. He then served in the Illinois Senate from 1983 to 1993. Lechowicz also served in the Cook County Board of Commissioners from 1990 to 2002. Lechowicz died at his home in Chicago, Illinois from heart failure.

Notes

External links

1938 births
2009 deaths
Politicians from Chicago
North Park University alumni
DePaul University alumni
Businesspeople from Illinois
Military personnel from Illinois
Members of the Cook County Board of Commissioners
Democratic Party members of the Illinois House of Representatives
Democratic Party Illinois state senators
Wilbur Wright College alumni